On April 10–12, 1965, a devastating severe weather event, known as the Palm Sunday tornado outbreak, affected the Midwestern and Southeastern United States. The outbreak produced at least 55 confirmed tornadoes, 18 of which were retrospectively considered to be violent on the Fujita scale. Only the 1974 Super Outbreak featured a larger number of F4–F5 tornadoes. At least three of the 18 F4s recorded during the 1965 outbreak—near Dunlap, Indiana, Lebanon–Sheridan, Indiana, and Pittsfield–Strongsville, Ohio, respectively—may have reached F5-level intensity. The outbreak was one of three major tornado outbreaks to coincide with the Christian holy day Palm Sunday, the others having occurred in 1920 and 1994.

Confirmed tornadoes

April 10 event

April 11 event

April 12 event

See also
Lists of tornadoes and tornado outbreaks
List of North American tornadoes and tornado outbreaks
Tornado outbreak of April 2–3, 1956 – Produced a powerful F5 tornado family in Michigan
1920 Palm Sunday tornado outbreak – Generated deadly F4 tornadoes in the Great Lakes region
1994 Palm Sunday tornado outbreak – Yielded long-tracked, intense tornadoes from Alabama to the Carolinas
1974 Super Outbreak – Associated with numerous violent tornadoes across much of Indiana and Greater Cincinnati

Notes

References

Sources

All articles with unsourced statements
F4 tornadoes by date
Tornadoes of 1965
Tornadoes in Illinois
Tornadoes in Indiana
Tornadoes in Michigan
Tornadoes in Ohio
Palm Sunday Tornado Outbreak, 1965
Palm Sunday tornado outbreaks
Tornado outbreaks
Strongsville, Ohio
April 1965 events in the United States
1965 in Michigan